Zang Jinsheng (born 11 May 1959) is a Chinese actor. He is a member of the China Television Artists Association, Institute of Broadcasting and Television of China, and China Film Association. He is best known for portraying Lu Zhishen and Zhu Bajie in the television series The Water Margin (1998) and Journey to the West (2011) respectively.

Early life
Zang was born in Tianjin on 11 May 1959. He worked in a factory during the Cultural Revolution and also served in the People's Liberation Army.

In 1982, Zang enrolled in the Beijing Film Academy, where he majored in acting. He was assigned to the Beijing Film Studio as an actor after graduating in 1986.

Acting career
Zang began his career by appearing in minor roles in television series and films such as Gold King, The Case of the Silver Snake, Warrioress Errant Hei Hudie, Dragon Year Cops, After Separation, Monk Jigong and Ye Jianying. In 1993, he played Wuzhu, a general of the Jin dynasty, in the historical television series The Life of Yue Fei.

Zang rose to prominence in 1998 for portraying "Flowery Monk" Lu Zhishen in the television series The Water Margin, which was adapted from Shi Nai'an's classical novel of the same title.

In 2001, Zang appeared in a minor role as Monk Bujie in the wuxia television series Laughing in the Wind, an adaptation of Hong Kong writer Jin Yong's novel The Smiling, Proud Wanderer. He also played Hsinbyushin in the ancient costume comedy My Fair Princess III (2003), which was adapted from Taiwanese writer Chiung Yao's novels.

In 2008, Zang portrayed Zhang Fei in John Woo's Red Cliff, an epic war film based on the Battle of Red Cliffs. In 2009, he played Xie Xun in The Heaven Sword and Dragon Saber, a wuxia television series adapted from Jin Yong's novel of the same title. He also had a minor role as Qin Shi Huang in the television series The Myth (2010).

In 2011, Zang co-starred with Wu Yue, Nie Yuan and Elvis Tsui in Journey to the West as Zhu Bajie. The series had one of the highest viewership ratings in mainland China that year. In 2012, Zang played Duoji in Turbulence of the Mu Clan, a historical television series starring South Korean actress Choo Ja-hyun.

Personal life
Zang married singer Lu Ping, a graduate student in folk music at the Central Conservatory of Music, when he was 28. Their son, Zang Jian, was born in 1988.

Filmography

Film

Television

References

External links

1959 births
Beijing Film Academy alumni
Male actors from Tianjin
Living people
Chinese male film actors
Chinese male television actors